Chapman Rocks is a group of rocks in central Hero Bay on the north side of Livingston Island in the South Shetland Islands, Antarctica.  The area was visited by early 19th century sealers operating from nearby Blythe Bay.

The feature is named after Thomas Chapman, English trunk-maker of Southwark who in 1795 discovered a method of processing fur seal skins for use in the hat trade, thus initiating the industry in London.

Location

See also 
 Composite Antarctic Gazetteer
 List of Antarctic islands south of 60° S
 SCAR
 Territorial claims in Antarctica

Maps
 L.L. Ivanov. Antarctica: Livingston Island and Greenwich, Robert, Snow and Smith Islands. Scale 1:120000 topographic map.  Troyan: Manfred Wörner Foundation, 2009.

References

External links
Composite Antarctic Gazetteer.

Rock formations of Livingston Island